The Montenegro women's national under-16 basketball team is a national basketball team of Montenegro, administered by the Basketball Federation of Montenegro. It represents the country in women's international under-16 basketball competitions.

FIBA U16 Women's European Championship participations

See also
Montenegro women's national basketball team
Montenegro women's national under-18 basketball team
Montenegro men's national under-17 basketball team

References

External links
Archived records of Montenegro team participations

Basketball in Montenegro
U
Women's national under-16 basketball teams